Saint Garibdas Ji Maharaj was a spiritual leader and reformer. He took birth in 1717 A.D. to a family of Dhankhar jats in the village Chudani, District Jhajjar, Haryana, India. He was a rich farmer. According to his own account, his spiritual journey started when "Almighty God" Kabir came to meet him and gave him initiation at the age of 10 years. After getting spiritual awareness from "Almighty God Kabir", he uttered many Banis that are collected as holy book Garib Das ki Granth. Garibdas Panth is also a Kabirpanth. Saint Garib Das Ji told through his Banis that Kabir Sahib is the supreme God in Satlok. Garibdas died in 1778 A.D., and over his remains, a memorial was established.

Family and early life 
Sant Garibdas Ji was born in 1717 A.D. in the village Chhudani, district Jhajjar, Haryana in a Dhankhar family of Jats.  His father's name was Shri Balram Ji and his mother's name was Shrimati Rani Devi Ji. Village Chhudani is the maternal's village of Garib Das Ji Maharaj. His father belonged to the Dhankhar gotra of Karontha village, district Rohtak, Haryana. His father Shri Balaram Ji was married to Rani Devi, daughter of Shivlal Singh in village Chhudani. Shri Shivlal Ji had no son. Therefore, Shri Balaram Ji was kept in the house. After 12 years of marriage Sant Garib Das Ji Maharaj Ji was born in the village Chhudani. Shri Shivlal Ji had 2500 Bighas (big Bigha which is 2.75 times bigger than today's Bigha and counts for 1400 acres of land).

Shri Balaram was the heir of all that land and after him, his only son Sant Garib Das Ji inherited all that land. Garib Das Ji used to go to cow grazing with other cowherds since childhood.

Spiritual Journey 
Saint Garib Das's spiritual journey started when Kabir supposedly met him at the age of 10 years.

According to his account, after taking initiation from 'Lord Kabir', he went to Satlok with him. On the way, Kabir also showed him heaven. When they reached Satlok, he saw Kabir sitting on the throne. Garib das was shocked because Kabir was also standing alongside him. After a while, the two forms merged, and only Kabir remained, sitting on the throne. Then, Kabir sent him back to earth. After coming back to earth, he started 'revealing' these stories to the village folk 

The knowledge supposedly received from 'God' was compiled in seven months in Garib das's garden of berries by sitting under a Khejri (Jand) tree, and thus 'Garib Das ki granth' (Amarbodh, Amargranth) was composed. His followers claim that Garib Das ascended to 'Satlok' in 1778 at the age of 61. A memorial, Chhatri Saheb, was erected at the village Chhudani.  There is also a memorial Chhatri Sahib built in his name.

Kabirpanth 
The sect ongoing from Saint Garib Das Ji Garibdas Panth is also a Kabirpanth. And, in the Holy Kabir Sagar chapter Kabir Bani (Bodh Sagar) and chapter Kabir Charitr Bodh, Garibdas Panth is written as the twelfth sect (Panth) of Kabirpanth and that the twelfth Panth would be "the Dawn". It is also written in the Holy Kabir Sagar that the thirteenth Panth will emerge from the twelfth Panth only when Kabir Sahib himself would come in the twelfth Panth.

Work 

The Banis uttered by him are revered by his followers as Holy Garib Das ki granth a Holy Book that has the collection of the Banis of Sant Garib Das Ji Maharaj alone.

Philosophy 
Just after Garib Das returned to Earth, he uttered numerous Banis proclaiming  Kabir to be the Supreme God in Satlok.

Supposedly like Kabir, Garib Das Ji also has criticised both Hindus' and Muslims' spiritual leaders for ignorantly preaching wrong worship and knowledge in society - although the true teachings of Kabir at a matter of scholarly debate.

Present Lineage 
 Dayasagar Ji

Great Saint Followers 
 Satguru Brahm Sagar Ji Maharaj(Bhuriwale)[Chudani Dham]
 Swami Swatantra Dev Ji Maharaj
 Swami Sadhu Ram Ji Maharaj[Badshah Bulla,Nai Sarak,Chandni Chowk]
 Swami Avdhoot Mahanand Sukhanand Ji Maharaj[Avdhoot Bada,Purani Sheesham ki Jhadi,Muni Ki Reti,Rishikesh,Uttarakhand]
 Swami Narayan Das Ji Maharaj[Avdhoot Bada,Purani Sheesham ki Jhadi,Muni Ki Reti,Rishikesh,Uttarakhand]
 Swami Keshavanand Ji Maharaj[Avdhoot Bada,Purani Sheesham ki Jhadi,Muni Ki Reti,Rishikesh,Uttarakhand]
 Swami Brahmrishi Ji Maharaj[Avdhoot Bada,Purani Sheesham ki Jhadi,Muni Ki Reti,Rishikesh,Uttarakhand]
 Swami Hariprakash Ji Maharaj[Avdhoot Bada,Purani Sheesham ki Jhadi,Muni Ki Reti,Rishikesh,Uttarakhand]
 Swami Ramdevanand Ji Maharaj(Pathi Ji)[Avdhoot Bada,Purani Sheesham ki Jhadi,Muni Ki Reti,Rishikesh,Uttarakhand]
 Swami Mahimanand Ji Maharaj[Avdhoot Bada,Purani Sheesham ki Jhadi,Muni Ki Reti,Rishikesh,Uttarakhand]
 Swami Ganganand Ji Maharaj[Talwandi Khurd,Ludhiana,Punjab]
 Swami Shankeranand Ji Bhuriwale
 Swami Nijanand Ji Maharaj[Haridwar,Uttarakhand]
 Swami Sacchidanand Ji Maharaj[Haridwar,Uttarakhand]
 Swami Mukhtyar Das Ji[Kandhera,Baghpat,Uttar Pradesh]
 Mata Channo Devi Ji [Punjab]
 Swami Lal Dass  Ji Maharaj Bhuriwale Rakbewale
 Swami Mahanand Ji Maharaj - Amritsar wale
 Swami Avdhoot Bhagat Ram Ji Maharaj Bhuriwale
 Swami Dr. Shree Shyam Sunder Das Shastri Ji Maharaj
 Swami Brahmanand Ji Maharaj Bhuriwale Gauanwale
 Swami Chetnanand Ji Maharaj Bhuriwale Kashiwale
 '''Maharishi Gangadas Ji Maharaj [Dehradun, Chhawla, Barota Gohana Wale]

See also

 Kabir

 Dadu Dayal

Maluk Das

 Dharamdas

Bhuriwale

References

External links 

Online portal for Baba Garib Dass Ji's Baani
Complete Bani of Sri Garib Dass hee,  https://web.archive.org/web/20121128063214/http://www.banigaribdasji.com/index_files/Hour1.htm

1717 births
1778 deaths
People from Jhajjar district
Hindu activists
Bhakti movement
18th-century Indian people